Pavel Vasilʹevich Volobuev (1 January 1923 - 1977) was an Azerbaijani historian who published the multi-volume History of the USSR in 1966. He was appointed director of the Institute of the History of the USSR of the Academy of Sciences of the Soviet Union in 1969.

Selected publications
 Monopolisticheskii kapitalizm v Rossii i ego osobennosti. Moscow, 1956.
 Ekonomicheskaia politika Vremmennogo pravitel’stva. Moscow, 1962.
 Proletariat i burzhuaziia Rossii v 1917. Moscow, 1964.
 V. I. Lenin ob obshchikh zakonomernostiakh Velikoi Oktiabr’skoi sotsialisticheskoi revoliutsii. Moscow, 1966.

References

External links 
Volobuev, P. V. (Pavel VasilÊ¹evich) [WorldCat Identities]

1923 births
1977 deaths
People from Kostanay Region
People from Kustanaysky Uyezd
Communist Party of the Soviet Union members
Soviet historians
20th-century Azerbaijani historians
Soviet military personnel of World War II